The North Texas Mean Green football team competes as part of the National Collegiate Athletic Association (NCAA) Division I Football Bowl Subdivision (FBS), representing North Texas University as part of the Conference USA (C-USA). North Texas will leave C-USA and join the American Athletic Conference for the 2023 season. Since 2016, the team's current head coach has been Seth Littrell.

The Mean Green have played 106 seasons of football, compiling a record of 530–527–33 and winning 26 conference championships (1 in the Texas Intercollegiate Athletic Association, 8 in the Lone Star Conference, 5 in the Gulf Coast Conference, 6 in the Missouri Valley Conference, 2 in the Southland Conference, and 4 in the Sun Belt Conference). The Mean Green appeared in 12 bowl games, and they appeared in the FCS playoffs four times.

North Texas fielded their first team in 1913 under coach J. W. Pender. After competing as an independent during their early years, the then named Eagles joined the Texas Intercollegiate Athletic Association (TIAA) in 1922, and were TIAA champions in 1931. Next as a member of the Lone Star Conference from 1932 to 1948, the Eagles captured eight championships. In 1946, North Texas defeated Pacific (CA) in the Optimist Bowl for their first all-time bowl victory. The Eagles' would win another 11 combined conference championships as members of the Gulf Coast Conference and the Missouri Valley Conference from 1949 to 1974.

After a brief stint as an I-A Independent from 1975 to 1981, the Mean Green participated in their first NCAA Division I-AA postseason in 1983 after the won the Southland Conference championship, when they lost at Nevada. North Texas moved back to the I-A Division in 1995, and were defeated in their first modern bowl game by Colorado State in the 2001 New Orleans Bowl.

Seasons

References

North Texas

North Texas Mean Green football seasons